Henri Zwiers (10 February 1900 – 2 June 1992) was a Dutch architect. His work was part of the architecture event in the art competition at the 1936 Summer Olympics.

References

1900 births
1992 deaths
20th-century Dutch architects
Olympic competitors in art competitions
Architects from Amsterdam